Allium xichuanense is a  plant species native to the Sichuan and Yunnan regions in southern China. It grows at elevations of 3100–4400 m.

Allium xichuanense has a single egg-shaped bulb up to 12 mm in diameter. Scape it up to 40 cm tall, round in cross-section. Leaves are tubular, up to 4 mm in diameter, about  the same length as the scape. Umbel spherical, densely crowded with many yellow flowers.

References

External links
line drawing of Allium xichuanense, Flora of China Illustrations vol. 24, fig. 212, 1-5 

xichuanense
Onions
Flora of China
Flora of Yunnan
Flora of Sichuan
Plants described in 1980